The posterior humeral circumflex artery (posterior circumflex artery, posterior circumflex humeral artery) arises from the third part of axillary artery at the lower border of the subscapularis, and runs posteriorly with the axillary nerve through the quadrangular space.

It winds around the surgical neck of the humerus and is distributed to the deltoid muscle and shoulder-joint, anastomosing with the anterior humeral circumflex and deep artery of the arm.

It supplies the teres major, teres minor, deltoid, and (long head only) triceps muscles.

Additional images

See also
 Anterior humeral circumflex artery

References

External links
 
 

Arteries of the upper limb